The Tyndrum Hills are a mountain range located to the south-west of Tyndrum in the Scottish Highlands, within the Strath Fillan and Breadalbane area. They are also within Loch Lomond and the Trossachs National Park and are also known for the famous mountain Ben Lui.

The mountains include:
 Ben Lui, 
 Beinn a' Chleibh, 
 Ben Oss, 
 Beinn Dubhchraig, 
 Beinn Chuirn, 

Mountain ranges of Scotland
Mountains and hills of Stirling (council area)
Mountains and hills of Argyll and Bute